Mooseheart, located in Kane County, Illinois, is an unincorporated community and a home for children administered by the Loyal Order of Moose. Also known as the City of Children, the community is featured as a 1949 episode of Metro-Goldwyn-Mayer's short film series Passing Parade, which was written and narrated by John Nesbitt. In 2013, Mooseheart celebrated its 100th anniversary with a rededication ceremony, public tours, fireworks, and other festivities.

Like Moose Lodges, Mooseheart was originally only open to Caucasians. The facility was created to be a home for the widows and the children of members of the Loyal Order of Moose. Later, any child who had a family member who was a member of the Moose could be admitted. In 1994, admission policies were changed to allow any child in need to apply for admission, regardless of the family's affiliation or lack thereof with the Moose.

In the 1950s, a pediatrician conducting a longitudinal study of children's growth at Mooseheart recalled there was tension since he felt that the board of directors was conducting the study to prove the superiority of the white race. By the 1990s, Mooseheart was open to children of all races and predominantly enrolled minority children.

In 1994, four Mooseheart employees were convicted of sexually abusing children. Two years later, a Mooseheart employee was convicted of possession of child pornography.

See also
Moose International

References 

 Reymert & Hinton 1940, "The effect of a change to a relatively superior environment upon the IQs of one hundred children", The Thirty-Ninth Yearbook Of The National Society For The Study Of Education: Intelligence, Its Nature And Nurture, Part II: Original Studies And Experiments

External links

 Mooseheart
 CORE: Coalition for Residential Education

Organizations based in Illinois
Unincorporated communities in Kane County, Illinois
Populated places established in 1912
1912 establishments in Illinois
Unincorporated communities in Illinois
Moose International
Orphanages in the United States